Sakovo is a rural locality (a village) in Teplogorskoye Rural Settlement, Velikoustyugsky District, Vologda Oblast, Russia. The population was 3 as of 2002.

Geography 
Sakovo is located 68 km southeast of Veliky Ustyug (the district's administrative centre) by road. Teplogorye is the nearest rural locality.

References 

Rural localities in Velikoustyugsky District